The 1960 Australian Drivers' Championship was a CAMS sanctioned national motor racing title for drivers of Formula Libre cars. The title was contested over a seven race series with the winner awarded the 1960 CAMS Gold Star. It was the 4th Australian Drivers' Championship.

The series was won by Alec Mildren of the Australian Capital Territory, driving his Maserati powered Cooper T51. Mildren won four of the seven races, including the 1960 Australian Grand Prix at Lowood and placed second at Longford to finish 14 points ahead of Bib Stillwell (Cooper T51-Climax). Stillwell and third placed driver Bill Patterson (Cooper T51-Climax) each won one race, at Port Wakefield and Phillip Island respectively, as did Jack Brabham, who won at Longford in his Cooper T51-Climax.

Race calendar
 
The championship was contested over a seven race series.

Points system
Championship points were awarded on a 12-7-5-3-2-1 basis for the first six places at each race, with only Australian license holders eligible. The championship was decided using the results of the Australian Grand Prix and the best five of the other six races.

Points table

References

Australian Drivers' Championship
Drivers' Championship